Teodoro Valfrè di Bonzo J.C.D. S.T.D. (21 August 1853 – 25 June 1922) was a Cardinal of the Roman Catholic Church and was former Prefect of Sacred Congregation of Religious.

Early life
He was born in Cavour, Italy as the son of Count Giacinto Valfrè and Erminia del Carretto. He was educated at the Seminary of Turin and later at the University of Turin where he earned a doctorate in theology in 1876. He received minor orders on 7 March 1875 and the subdiaconate on 18 December 1875 and the diaconate on 1 April 1876. He was a classmate and friend of Giacomo della Chiesa who was to be the future Pope Benedict XV. He was ordained on 10 June 1876 and earned a doctorate in canon law  in 1880.

He was created Domestic prelate of His Holiness and was appointed as Apostolic delegate and extraordinary envoy to Costa Rica on 11 July 1884. However, his mission was delayed because of the outbreak of the antireligious movement prevalent at the time with diplomatic relations not normalized until 1908.

Episcopate
He was appointed Bishop of Cuneo on 27 March 1885 by Pope Leo XIII. He was transferred to the diocese of Como on 18 March 1895. He was promoted to the metropolitan see of Vercelli by Pope Pius X on 27 March 1905. He was transferred to the titular see of Trebizonda in 1916 and appointed as Nuncio to Austria-Hungary on 14 September that year. He represented the Pope Benedict XV at the coronation of the new Austrian Emperor Karl I and Empress Zita.

Cardinalate
He was created and proclaimed Cardinal-Priest of Santa Maria sopra Minerva in the consistory of 15 December 1919 by Pope Benedict. He was appointed as Prefect of Sacred Congregation of Religious on 6 March 1920. He took part in the conclave of 1922 that elected Pope Pius XI. He died in 1922.

References

1853 births
1922 deaths
Apostolic Nuncios to Austria
20th-century Italian cardinals
Members of the Congregation for Institutes of Consecrated Life and Societies of Apostolic Life
Pontifical Roman Seminary alumni